The U.S. Post Office-Milford Main, also known as Milford Main Post Office, is a historic post office building at 6 West River Street in Milford, Connecticut. It is a red brick building, trimmed with limestone, that was designed by James A. Wetmore and completed in 1931.  It is a fine local example of Classical Revival design, making a significant contribution to a cluster of civic buildings around a triangular park north of Milford's commercial district.  The building was listed on the National Register of Historic Places in 1986.

Description and history
Milford's main post office occupies a prominent position, facing west toward the city's triangular green on West River Street.  The single-story building is a rectangular structure, with a frame of steel and concrete which is faced in red brick and trimmed in limestone.  It is covered by a shallow hip roof, which is obscured by a brick parapet above a limestone cornice.  The main facade is five bays wide, with the three in the center projecting slightly.  The outermost bays have large sash windows, while the outer ones of the projection are topped by half-round windows and have sidelights.  The entry is in the center, also topped by a half-rond window, with the doorway framed by round columns and a modest entablature.

The post office was designed in 1929 and completed in 1931.  Its design is similar to a period post office in Newburyport, Massachusetts, but it is not known if a local architect was involved in its design.  Its design was affected by the terms of the 1926 Public Buildings Act, which dictated economic use of materials and harmonization with surrounding structures, which in this case would have included Milford City Hall (completed in 1919 at the north end of the green), but not the adjacent neoclassical state courthouse (not completed until 1936).

See also 
National Register of Historic Places listings in New Haven County, Connecticut
List of United States post offices

References 

Milford
Georgian Revival architecture in Connecticut
Colonial Revival architecture in Connecticut
Government buildings completed in 1931
Buildings and structures in Milford, Connecticut
National Register of Historic Places in New Haven County, Connecticut
1931 establishments in Connecticut